Atlanticus americanus, known generally as the American shieldback or American shield-bearer, is a species of shield-backed katydid in the family Tettigoniidae. It is found in North America.

Subspecies
These two subspecies belong to the species Atlanticus americanus:
 Atlanticus americanus americanus (Saussure, 1859)
 Atlanticus americanus hesperus Hebard, 1934

References

Tettigoniinae
Articles created by Qbugbot
Insects described in 1859